See one of the following pages:

List of American advertising characters
List of European advertising characters
List of Australian and New Zealand advertising characters
List of Japanese advertising characters